Studeria is a genus of sea urchins in the family Neolampadidae.

†Studeria elegans (syn. Catopygus elegans Laube, 1869) is the type species.

See also 
 List of prehistoric echinoid genera
 List of prehistoric echinoderm genera

References

External links 
 
 
 
 Scuderia at the World Register of marine Species (WoRMS)

Cassiduloida
Echinoidea genera